{{DISPLAYTITLE:C2H8N2}}
The molecular formula C2H8N2 (molar mass: 60.10 g/mol, exact mass: 60.0688 u) may refer to:

 Dimethylhydrazine
 Ethylenediamine, or ethane-1,2-diamine